Ministrymon clytie, the Clytie hairstreak, is a butterfly of the family Lycaenidae. It was described by William Henry Edwards in 1877. It is found from southern Arizona, New Mexico and Texas to Mexico, Guatemala and Costa Rica. The habitat consists of tropical forest openings and subtropical thorn forests.

The larvae feed on Pithecellobium species.

References

Butterflies described in 1877
Eumaeini
Taxa named by William Henry Edwards
Butterflies of North America